The Branch Davidians (or the General Association of Branch Davidian Seventh-day Adventists) are an apocalyptic new religious movement founded in 1955 by Benjamin Roden. They regard themselves as a continuation of the General Association of Davidian Seventh-Day Adventists, established by Victor Houteff in 1935.

Houteff, a Bulgarian immigrant and a Seventh-day Adventist, wrote a series of tracts entitled the "Shepherd's Rod", which called for the reform of the Seventh-day Adventist Church. After his ideas were rejected by Adventist leaders, Houteff and his followers formed the group that later became known as "Davidians" and some of them moved onto a tract of land outside and west of Waco, Texas, United States, where they built a community called the Mount Carmel Center, which served as the headquarters for the movement. After Houteff's death in 1955, his wife Florence took control of the Davidian organization. That same year, Roden (a follower of Houteff), proclaimed what he believed to be a new message from God and wrote a series of letters presenting it to Davidians. He signed these letters "The Branch" believing that to be the new name Jesus had taken (according to biblical prophecies such as Revelation 3:12 and Zechariah 6:12-13) to reflect a new stage of his work in the heavenly sanctuary. Those who accepted Roden's teachings became known as Branch Davidians Seventh Day Adventists.

In 1957, Florence sold the original Mount Carmel Center and purchased 941 acres near Elk, Texas – thirteen miles northeast of Waco – naming the property New Mount Carmel Center. After the failure of Florence's prophecy of apocalyptic events on or near April 22, 1959, she dissolved the Davidian Association in 1962 and sold all but 77.86 acres of the New Mount Carmel property. Roden took possession of New Mount Carmel in 1962 and began his efforts to purchase the remaining 77.86 acres. On February 27, 1973, New Mount Carmel was sold to "Benjamin Roden, Lois Roden, and their son George Roden, Trustees for the General Association of Branch Davidian Seventh-day Adventists." From this point on, the property was simply known as Mount Carmel. Upon the death of Roden in 1978, his wife Lois became the next Davidian prophet at the compound.

In 1981, a young man named Vernon Howell, later known as David Koresh, came to New Mount Carmel and studied biblical prophecy under Lois Roden. By the end of 1983, Howell had gained a group of followers and they separated from the Lois's organization to form a new organization by the name "The Davidian Branch Davidian Seventh Day Adventist Association." Meanwhile, Lois continued to operate the Branch Davidian Seventh Day Adventist Association from Mt. Carmel Center near Waco. It is notable that Howell's group and the Branch Davidians (Lois's group) were two separate organizations with different leaders and different names operating from different locations from 1983 forward. It was not until 1987, after Lois had died, that Howell filed a document claiming to be the president of the Branch Davidian Seventh Day Adventist Association (even though he had been leading a competing group for several years). Also in 1987, Koresh and some of his followers went to Mt. Carmel center and engaged in a shootout with George Roden that eventually resulted in Koresh's group occupying the land. The actions of Koresh and his followers in 1987 (taking the name and property of the Branch Davidian SDA organization) are regarded by Branch Davidians who remained loyal to Lois Roden as an act of identity theft against them. Koresh's leadership of his group ended at the climax of the Waco siege of 1993, a 51-day standoff between members of the sect and federal agents, when New Mount Carmel was destroyed in a fire. Four agents of the U.S. Bureau of Alcohol, Tobacco, and Firearms (ATF) and two residents of Mt. Carmel were killed by members of the sect during the initial raid, while four sect members were killed by ATF agents on February 28, 1993. Seventy-six members of Koresh's group, many of them children, died in a fire that erupted during the siege on April 19, 1993.

Early history 
In 1929, Victor Houteff, a Bulgarian immigrant and a Seventh-day Adventist Sabbath School teacher from southern California, claimed that he had a new message for the entire Adventist church. He presented his views in a book, The Shepherd's Rod: The 144,000 – A Call for Reformation. The Adventist leadership rejected Houteff's views as contrary to the church's basic teachings, and local church congregations disfellowshipped Houteff and his followers.

In 1934, Houteff established his headquarters to the west of Waco, Texas, and his group became known as the Davidians. In 1942, he renamed the group the General Association of Davidian Seventh-day Adventists  'Davidian' which indicated its belief in the restoration of the Davidic Kingdom of Israel. Following Houteff's death in 1955, his wife Florence usurped the leadership believing herself to be a prophet.  Convinced that an apocalypse would occur in 1959, a date which is not found in her husband's original writings, Florence and her council gathered hundreds of their faithful followers at the Mount Carmel Center, the group's compound which was located near Waco, for the fulfillment of the prophecy which is written in Ezekiel 9.

The anticipated events did not occur, and following this disappointment, Benjamin Roden formed another group which he called the Branch Davidians and succeeded in taking control of Mount Carmel.  The name of this group is an allusion to the anointed 'Branch' (mentioned in Zechariah 3:8; 6:12). When Benjamin Roden died in 1978, he was succeeded by his wife Lois Roden. Members of the Branch Davidians were torn between allegiance to Ben's wife or to his son, George. After Lois died, George assumed the right to the Presidency. However, less than a year later, Vernon Howell rose to power and became the leader over those in the group who sympathized with him.

Rise of David Koresh 

Howell's arrival at Mount Carmel in 1981 was well received by nearly everyone at the Davidian commune. He had engaged in an affair with Lois Roden while he was in his early 20s and she was in her late 60s. Howell wanted to father a child with her, who, according to his understanding, would be the Chosen One. When she died, George Roden inherited the positions of prophet and leader of the sect. A power struggle ensued between Roden and Howell, who soon gained the loyalty of the majority of the Davidians. In 1984, Howell and his followers left Mount Carmel (Roden accused Howell of starting a fire that consumed a $500,000 administration building and press), which Roden subsequently renamed "Rodenville". Another splinter group, led by Charlie Pace, also left, and settled in Alabama.

As an attempt to regain support, Roden challenged Howell to raise the dead, going so far as to exhume the corpse of a two-decades deceased Davidian in order to demonstrate his spiritual supremacy (Roden denied this, saying he had only been moving the community cemetery). This illegal act gave Howell an opportunity to attempt to file charges against Roden, but he was told that he needed evidence in order to substantiate the charges. On November 3, 1987, Howell and seven of his followers raided Mount Carmel, equipped with five .223 caliber semi-automatic rifles, two .22 caliber rifles, two 12-gauge shotguns and nearly 400 rounds of ammunition, in an apparent attempt to retake the compound. Although Howell's group claimed that it was trying to obtain evidence of Roden's illegal activities, its members did not take a camera with them.

The trial ended with the jury finding Howell's followers not guilty, but the jury members were unable to agree on a verdict for Howell himself. After his followers were acquitted, Howell invited the prosecutors to Mount Carmel for ice cream.

It is claimed that Howell was never authorized to name his breakaway sect the "Branch Davidians", and the church which bears that name continues to represent the members of the Branch church who did not follow him.

As a spiritual leader 
Howell, who acquired the position of spiritual leader from Roden, asserted it by changing his name to David Koresh, suggesting that he had ties to the biblical King David and Cyrus the Great (Koresh is the Hebrew version of the name Cyrus). He wanted to create a new lineage of world leaders. This practice later served as the basis for allegations that Koresh was committing child abuse, which contributed to the siege by the ATF.

Interpreting Revelation 5:2, Koresh identified himself with the Lamb mentioned therein. This is traditionally believed to symbolize Jesus Christ; however, Koresh suggested that the Lamb would come before Jesus and pave the way for his Second Coming.

By the time of the 1993 Waco siege, Koresh had encouraged his followers to think of themselves as "students of the Seven Seals," rather than as "Branch Davidians." During the standoff, one of his followers publicly announced that he wanted them to thereafter be identified by the name "Koreshians".

Federal siege 

On February 28, 1993, at 4:20 am, the Bureau of Alcohol, Tobacco, and Firearms attempted to execute a search warrant relating to alleged sexual abuse charges and illegal weapons violations. The ATF attempted to breach the compound for approximately two hours until their ammunition ran low. Four ATF agents (Steve Willis, Robert Williams, Todd McKeehan, and Conway Charles LeBleu) were killed and another 16 agents were wounded during the raid. The five Branch Davidians killed in the 9:45 am raid were Winston Blake (British), Peter Gent (Australian), Peter Hipsman, Perry Jones, and Jaydean Wendell; two were killed by the Branch Davidians. Almost six hours after the ceasefire, Michael Schroeder was shot dead by ATF agents who alleged he fired a pistol at agents as he attempted to re-enter the compound with Woodrow Kendrick and Norman Allison. His wife said he was merely returning from work and had not participated in the day's earlier altercation. Schroeder had been shot once in the eye, once in the heart, and five times in the back.

After the raid, ATF agents established contact with Koresh and others inside of the compound. The FBI took command after the deaths of federal agents, and managed to facilitate the release of 19 children (without their parents) relatively early into the negotiations. The children were then interviewed by the FBI and the Texas Rangers. The children had been physically and sexually abused before the raid.

On April 19, 1993, the FBI moved for a final siege of the compound using large weaponry such as .50 caliber (12.7 mm) rifles and armored Combat Engineering Vehicles (CEV) to combat the heavily armed Branch Davidians. The FBI attempted to use tear gas to flush out the Branch Davidians. Officially, FBI agents were only permitted to return any incoming fire, not to actively assault the Branch Davidians. When several Branch Davidians opened fire, the FBI's response was to increase the amount of gas being used. Around noon, three fires broke out simultaneously in different parts of the building. The government maintains that the fires were deliberately started by Branch Davidians. Some Branch Davidian survivors maintain that the fires were started either accidentally or deliberately by the assault. Of the 85 Branch Davidians in the compound when the final siege began, 76 died on April 19 in various ways, from falling rubble to suffocating effects of the fire, or by gunshot from fellow Branch Davidians. The siege had lasted 51 days.

Aftermath 
In all, four ATF agents were killed, 16 were wounded, and six Branch Davidians died in the initial raid on February 28. 76 more died in the final assault on April 19. The events at Waco spurred criminal prosecution and civil litigation. A federal grand jury indicted 12 of the surviving Branch Davidians – including Clive Doyle, Brad Branch, Ruth Riddle, and Livingstone Fagan – charging them with aiding and abetting in murder of federal officers, and unlawful possession and use of various firearms. Eight Branch Davidians were convicted on firearms charges, five convicted of voluntary manslaughter, and four were acquitted of all charges. As of July 2007, all Branch Davidians had been released from prison.

Civil suits were brought against the United States government, federal officials, former governor of Texas Ann Richards, and members of the Texas Army National Guard. The bulk of these claims were dismissed because they were insufficient as a matter of law or because the plaintiffs could advance no material evidence in support of them. One case, Andrade v. Chojnacki, made it to the Fifth Circuit, which upheld a previous ruling of "take-nothing, denied".

After the siege 

There are several groups that claim descent from the Branch Davidians today. The group that retains the original name "Branch Davidian Seventh Day Adventist" regards Lois Roden's immediate successor to have been Doug Mitchell (who joined the Branch Davidians in 1978 and led the group from 1986 until his death in 2013) and Mitchell's successor was to be Trent Wilde (who has led the group since 2013). This group never followed David Koresh.
Another group exists under the leadership of Charles Pace, called The Branch, The Lord Our Righteousness. It is a legally recognized denomination with 12 members. Pace, while regarding Koresh as appointed by God, says that Koresh twisted the Bible's teachings by fathering more than a dozen children with members' wives. Pace believes that the Lord "has anointed me and appointed me to be the leader", but he says he is "not a prophet" but "a teacher of righteousness". Others, led by Clive Doyle, continue to believe Koresh was a prophet and await his resurrection, along with the followers who were killed. Both of these groups are still waiting for the end of times. Doyle died in June 2022.

Relationship with Seventh-Day Adventists 
The Seventh-day Adventist Church, the main church in the Adventist tradition, rejected Victor Houteff's teachings and revoked his membership in 1930. 

Houteff then went on to found the Davidian Seventh Day Adventist Church (an offshoot which is also known as the Shepherd's Rod). The Branch Davidians are an offshoot of the Davidians and they are also a product of a schism which was initiated by Benjamin Roden, after Houteff’s death and in light of Florence’s (Houteff’s wife) usurpation of power.  

Florence believed that she was a prophet.  But her prediction of the demise of the Seventh Day Adventist Church, which according to her should’ve occurred 42 months after Houtte’s death (1959) failed to materialize.  Likewise, Ben Roden believed that he was a prophet as well as a rightful heir to the leadership of the Davidians.  

While they were still formally members of the Seventh-day Adventist Church, the Branch Davidian leaders demanded a reform of the church and when their demand was met with opposition (by both the Seventh-day Adventists and the Davidians), they decided to leave that denomination and at the same time, they widely distanced themselves from the Davidians.

The Seventh-day Adventist Church deprived both the Branch Davidians and the Davidians of their membership in the denomination, in spite of this fact, the Branch Davidians actively continued to "hunt" members of the Seventh-day Adventist Church, and encourage them to leave it and join their group. The Seventh-day Adventists were reportedly "apprehensive" about the group's views because Branch Davidians claimed that they were the "only rightful continuation of the Adventist message", based on their belief that Victor Houteff was the divinely selected prophet and the successor of Ellen G. White. Both the Davidians and the Branch Davidians claimed that Houteff was their spiritual inspiration, as the founder of the Davidians. The Seventh-day Adventist Church issued warnings about the Branch Davidian sect's views to its members on a regular basis.

Schisms within the Branch Davidian sect 
There is documented evidence (FBI negotiation transcripts between Kathryn Shroeder and Steve Schneider with interjections from Koresh himself) that David Koresh and his followers did not call themselves Branch Davidians. In addition, David Koresh, through forgery, stole the identity of the Branch Davidian Seventh-day Adventists for the purpose of obtaining the New Mount Carmel Center's property.

The doctrinal beliefs of the Branch Davidians differ on teachings such as the Holy Spirit and his nature, and the feast days and their requirements. Both groups have disputed the relevance of the other's spiritual authority based on the proceedings which followed Victor Houteff's death. From its inception in 1930, the Davidians/Shepherd's Rod group believed that it was living in a time when Biblical prophecies of the Last Judgment were coming to pass as a prelude to Christ's Second Coming.

In the late 1980s, Koresh and his followers abandoned many Branch Davidian teachings. Koresh became the group's self-proclaimed final prophet. "Koreshians" became the majority as a result of a schism which occurred among the Branch Davidians, but some of the Branch Davidians did not join Koresh's group, instead, they gathered around George Roden or they became independent. Following a series of violent shootouts between Roden's and Koresh's group, the New Mount Carmel compound was eventually taken over by the "Koreshians".

Pop culture
In 2021, the Branch Davidians were one of the subjects on Season 1, episode 7 of Vice Media's Dark Side of the 90s entitled "A Tale of Two Cults", the other being Heaven's Gate.

See also 

 Alamo Christian Foundation
 Apocalypticism
 British Israelism
 Christian fundamentalism
 Christian Zionism
 Christianity and Judaism
 Christianity and violence
 Judaizers
 Judeo-Christian
 List of Christian denominations
 List of messiah claimants
 List of new religious movements
 List of people claimed to be Jesus
 List of Seventh-day Adventists
 Millenarianism
 New religious movement
 Philo-Semitism
 Polygamy in Christianity
 Polygamy in North America
 Religious abuse
 Religious violence
 Spiritual abuse

References

External links 
 The BRANCH, The LORD Our Righteousness
 The General Association of Branch Davidian Seventh Day Adventists
 The Universal Publishing Association-Shepherd's Rod
 The Advent Movement

 
1959 establishments in Texas
Christian organizations established in 1959
Organizations based in Texas
Branch Davidianism
Adventism
Cults
Christian denominations established in the 20th century
Paramilitary organizations based in the United States
Religious paramilitary organizations
Seventh-day denominations
Christian new religious movements
Religious controversies in the United States
Religious scandals
Scandals in Christian organizations
Waco siege
Religious belief systems founded in the United States